Wainuia edwardi is a rare terrestrial gastropod mollusc in the family Rhytididae, endemic to the South Island of New Zealand.

Distribution 
This species occurs in New Zealand

Feeding habits 
Wainuia edwardi feeds mainly on earthworms.

Life cycle 
Dimensions of eggs of Wainuia edwardi (?) are 5 × 3.75 mm.

References

Rhytididae
Gastropods described in 1899